Ten Years in One Night (Live) is a live album by American post-punk band Tuxedomoon, released in 1989 by Cramboy and Play It Again Sam. The CD issue has an abridged track listing, removing three songs from the album.

Track listing

Personnel 
Adapted from the Pinheads on the Move liner notes.

Tuxedomoon
 Steven Brown
 Peter Dachert
 Bruce Geduldig
 Ivan Georgiev
 Luc Van Lieshout
 Blaine L. Reininger
 Winston Tong
 Paul Zahl

Production and additional personnel
 Luc Gerlo – engineering
 Frankie Lievaart – engineering
 James Neiss – executive producer

Release history

References

External links 
 

1989 live albums
Tuxedomoon albums
Crammed Discs live albums
PIAS Recordings live albums